Balkumari ( is a village and Village Development Committee in Bhaktapur District in the Bagmati Zone of central Nepal. At the time of the 1991 Nepal census it had a population of 8,790 with 1,349 houses.

References

Populated places in Bhaktapur District